Adolphe Hubert (born 14 December 1907, date of death unknown) was a Luxembourgian footballer. He played in two matches for the Luxembourg national football team from 1927 to 1928. He was also part of Luxembourg's squad for the football tournament at the 1928 Summer Olympics, but he did not play in any matches.

References

External links
 

1907 births
Year of death missing
Luxembourgian footballers
Luxembourg international footballers
Place of birth missing
Association football midfielders
Union Luxembourg players